The 1942 VPI Gobblers football team represented Virginia Agricultural and Mechanical College and Polytechnic Institute in the 1942 college football season. The team was led by their head coaches Sumner D. Tilson and Herbert McEver and finished with a record of seven wins, two losses and one tie (7–2–1).

Schedule

NFL Draft selections

Players

Roster

Varsity letter winners
Twenty-eight players received varsity letters for their participation on the 1942 VPI team.

References 

VPI
Virginia Tech Hokies football seasons
VPI Gobblers football